Varasichthys is an extinct genus of ray-finned fish that lived during the Oxfordian stage of the Late Jurassic epoch. It contains one species, Varasichthys ariasi, fossils of which have been found in the Domeyko Range of Antofagasta Region, northern Chile. It has been placed in the family Varasichthyidae together with the genera Bobbichthys, Domeykos, Luisichthys and Protoclupea.

References 

Crossognathiformes
Prehistoric ray-finned fish genera
Oxfordian genera
Late Jurassic fish
Jurassic fish of South America
Jurassic Chile
Fossils of Chile
Fossil taxa described in 1981